The American Library Association and Library of Congress Romanization Tables for Russian, or the Library of Congress system, are a set of rules for the romanization of Russian-language text from Cyrillic script to Latin script.

The ALA-LC Romanization tables comprise a set of standards for romanization of texts in various languages, written in non-Latin writing systems. These romanization systems are intended for bibliographic cataloguing, and used in US and Canadian libraries, by the British Library since 1975, and in many publications worldwide. 

The romanization tables were first discussed by the American Library Association in 1885, and published in 1904 and 1908, including rules for romanizing some languages written in Cyrillic script: Church Slavic, Serbo-Croatian, and Russian in the pre-reform alphabet. Revised tables including more languages were published in 1941, and a since-discontinued version of the entire standard was printed in 1997. The system for Russian remains virtually unchanged from 1941 to the latest release, with the current Russian table published online in 2012. 

The formal, unambiguous version of the system requires some diacritics and two-letter tie characters which are often omitted in practice.

The table below combines material from the ALA-LC tables for Russian (2012) and, for some obsolete letters, Church Slavic (2011).

See also 
 Scientific transliteration of Cyrillic (1898)
  (PI) (1899)
 Romanization of Russian

References

External links 
 ALA-LC Romanization Tables at the U.S. Library of Congress
 CyrAcademisator Bi-directional online transliteration of Russian according to ALA-LC (diacritics). Supports Old Slavonic characters
 Online Russian Transliterator Supports ALA-LC, ISO 9, GOST 7.79B and other standards.

ALA-LC romanization
Romanization of Cyrillic
Russian language